South Carolina Highway 248 (SC 248) is a  primary state highway in the U.S. state of South Carolina. It serves as main access to the Ninety Six National Historic Site.

Route description

SC 248 is a two-lane rural highway that traverses from Epworth at U.S. Route 178 (US 178) to Ninety Six at SC 34/SC 246.

History
Established in 1940, it is the second SC 248 and has remained unchanged since inception. The first SC 248 was established by 1930 as a renumbering of SC 151 from US 29/SC 24 in Anderson to SC 20 in Williamston. In 1935, SC 248 was renumbered as part of US 29.

Major intersections

See also

References

External links

SC 248 at Virginia Highways' South Carolina Highways Annex

248
Transportation in Greenwood County, South Carolina